Sanggaiyumpham (Sangaiyumpham) or Sanggai Yumpham (Sangai Yumpham) is a village in Thoubal district of Manipur.

Etymology 
In Meitei language, "sanggāi" means residence or home, used in formal context. The term "sangāi" is the Meitei name of the brow-antlered deer, scientifically known as Cervus eldi eldi. The Meitei term "yumpham" literally means "the place where a house is built". Morphologically, "yum‑pham" can be divided into two root words, "yum" and "pham", meaning "house" and "place" respectively.

See also 
 Kakching
 Moirang
 Imphal

Notes and references

External links 
 
 
 Sangaiyumpham at Internet Archive

Thoubal district